A Chromebox is a small form-factor PC running Google's ChromeOS operating system. The first device debuted in May 2012.

History
Chromeboxes, like other ChromeOS devices including Chromebook laptops, primarily support web applications, thereby relying heavily on an Internet connection for both software functionality and data storage. That connection, via a local area network, can be wireless or through an Ethernet port.

The machines are classed as small form-factor PCs and typically feature a power switch and a set of connections to support a keyboard, pointing device and one or more monitors.  Solid state drives are used for storage and only wireless printers are supported. The first Chromebox, released by Samsung on May 29, 2012, ran a dual-core Intel Celeron Processor 867 at 1.3 GHz, and featured six USB 2.0 ports and two DisplayPort++ slots compatible with HDMI, DVI, and VGA.

In February 2014, Google bundled an Intel Core i7 Chromebox with a business video conferencing package, 1080p high definition camera module, external microphone/speaker and remote control. This Chromebox for Meetings system retailed for $999 plus a $250 annual management fee, waived the first year—a cost thousands of dollars less than other unified videoconferencing systems, including those from Cisco and Polycom. The system employed a Google Hangouts-like interface for up to 15 participants, a dedicated URL for sharing screens, and management accounts for scheduling meetings. An updated system announced in November 2017 featured a 4K camera and a machine learning feature that automatically identifies and frames participants.

In March 2014, Asus established a new price at the low-end of the Chromebox market with a compact, 1.32 pound model that retailed at $179 and featured a Celeron CPU and four USB 3.0 ports. Yahoo Tech columnist David Pogue called the Asus device among the smallest, "least-expensive desktop computers ever sold", likening it to a Smart car. "You won’t be hauling lumber from Home Depot in it, but it’s a terrific deal—and most days, it’ll get you where you want to go." In May, Asus released a faster model with an Intel Core i3 processor. Hewlett-Packard entered the market in June with a Chromebox powered by an Intel Celeron processor, optionally bundling a keyboard and mouse. In August, Acer introduced two models that could stand vertically and provided some business-oriented features, including encryption and fast deletion of local data. In September, Dell entered the market with an entry-level machine, as well as Dell's implementation of the Google video conferencing system.

In August 2015, AOpen announced a family of Chromeboxes designed principally for driving the content of digital commercial signage. The models were ruggedized for on-site operation.

The capability to run Android apps with ChromeOS devices, introduced by Google in 2016 and realized by certain Chromebooks in 2017, seemed to bypass Chromeboxes until a cluster of new Chromebox offerings appeared in 2018, including Acer, Asus, and HP.  Oregon-based CTL (Compute Teach Learn), maker of Chromebooks since 2014, launched its first Chromebox in March 2018.

In late 2020, four major Chromebox manufacturers, HP, Acer, Asus, and CTL, announced plans for new Chromebox models based on the 10th generation Intel Comet Lake architecture.

Models

Notes

References

Cloud clients
Google hardware
Products introduced in 2012
Google Chrome
Personal computers